The 2015–16 Arkansas State Red Wolves men's basketball team represented Arkansas State University during the 2015–16 NCAA Division I men's basketball season. The Red Wolves, led by eighth year head coach John Brady, played their home games at the Convocation Center, and were members of the Sun Belt Conference. They finished the season 11–20, 7–13 in Sun Belt play to finish in a tie for ninth place. They failed to qualify for the Sun Belt tournament.

Prior to the season, head coach John Brady announced his intentions to resign following the season. On March 16, 2016, the school hired former Baylor assistant Grant McCasland as the new head coach.

Previous season 
The Redwolves finished the 2014–15 season 11–29, 6–14 in Sun Belt play to finish in 10th place. They failed to qualify for the Sun Belt tournament.

Roster

Schedule and results

|-
!colspan=9 style=| Exhibition
 
|-
!colspan=9 style=| Non-conference regular season

 
 
 
 
 

|-
!colspan=9 style=| Sun Belt regular season

References

Arkansas State Red Wolves men's basketball seasons
Arkansas State